"Blubber Boy" is a song by Australian rock band Regurgitator. The song was released as a radio single in Australia in 1995
promoting the band's second EP New (1995). The song was released in the UK as a CD and 7" Single. The song ranked at number 17 on Triple J's Hottest 100 in 1995. A remixed version of the song was released on the band's debut studio album, Tu-Plang in 1996.

In 2019, Tyler Jenke from The Brag ranked Regurgitator's best songs, with "Blubber Boy" coming it at number 3. Jenke said "It's not often that bands get their start by singing a song based upon an Inuit fairytale about drowned boyfriends and blubber… replacements, but Regurgitator aren't exactly a normal band. A prime example of their early talent, 'Blubber Boy' is still a tune whose chorus commands a massive singalong during a live show."

Track listings

Release history

References

 

1995 singles
1995 songs
Regurgitator songs
Songs written by Quan Yeomans
Song recordings produced by Magoo (Australian producer)
Warner Music Australasia singles